Augustus Akhabue Aikhomu (20 October 1939 – 17 August 2011) was an Admiral in the Nigerian Navy, who served as the de facto Vice President of Nigeria under military head of state General Ibrahim Babangida from 1986 to 1993.

Early life 
He hailed from Idumebo-Irrua, Edo State, in southern Nigeria. As a student, Aikhomu spent various periods of his early life studying at Irrua Government School, Yaba College of Technology, Royal Britannia Naval College in Dartmouth, England, Long Gunnery Specialist Course, India and the National Institute of Policy and Strategic Studies, Kuru, Nigeria.

Naval career 
Aikhomu joined the Nigerian Navy on 1 December 1958. He joined the Royal Navy as an Artificer Apprentice with Series 35 entry at HMS Fisgard near Torpoint, East Cornwall in January 1959. He was in Grenville Division at HMS Fisgard and would have completed his 16 months Part 1 training at the end of April 1960. 

Aikhomu was the Commanding Officer, Shore Patrol Craft, commanding officer, NNS Dorina, chief of naval personnel, naval headquarters, chief of naval operations (1983–84), and chief of naval staff (1984–86).

Vice President and Chief of General Staff 
Admiral Augustus served as the de facto Vice President of Nigeria under military president General Ibrahim Babangida from 1986 to 1993.

Later career 
He was at a time the Chairman of the Board of Trustees of All Nigeria Peoples Party, an opposition party in the country. Aikhomu contributed to the Irrua Specialist Hospital specializing in lassa fever management. He died on 17 August 2011, aged 71. Aikhomu is survived by his wife, Rebecca, and five children, Mark, Eheje, Vinitha, Suzanne, and Ebi.

References 

Those Who May Replace Obasanjo

1939 births
2011 deaths
Vice presidents of Nigeria
Nigerian Navy admirals
Graduates of Britannia Royal Naval College
People from Edo State
Members of the Nigerian National Institute of Policy and Strategic Studies
Chiefs of Naval Staff (Nigeria)